Ernst Ferdinand Klein (3 September 1744 in Breslau – 18 March 1810 in Berlin) was a German jurist and prominent representative of the Berlin Enlightenment.

Career
Klein studied law at Halle under Daniel Nettelbladt, a follower of Christian Wolff, before practising law in Breslau. In 1781 he moved to Berlin, where he served in the Prussian justice department as an adviser to Frederick's High Chancellor Johann H. C. von Carmer and worked with Carl Gottlieb Svarez to co-author the reforming Prussian Civil Code, the Allgemeines Landrecht. He was active in the Mittwochsgesellschaft (Wednesday Society): his Freiheit und Eigenthum (1790) was presented as a set of dialogues between members of the society.  In 1791 he returned to Halle, and in 1800 was once again in Berlin as an Upper Court Councillor.

Works 
 Freiheit und Eigenthum [Freedom and Property], 1790
 Grundsätze des gemeinen deutschen und preußischen peinlichen Rechts. Halle 1796 (2nd ed. Halle 1799). 
 Grundsätze der natürlichen Rechtswissenschaft, 1797

References

Further reading 
 Klaus Berndl, Ernst Ferdinand Klein Ein Zeitbild aus der zweiten Hälfte des Achtzehnten Jahrhunderts 
Michael Kleensang: Das Konzept der bürgerlichen Gesellschaft bei Ernst Ferdinand Klein. Einstellungen zu Naturrecht, Eigentum, Staat und Gesetzgebung in Preußen 1780-1810 (=Studien zur Europäischen Rechtsgeschichte Bd. 108), Frankfurt 1998. 

1743 births
1810 deaths
Jurists from Saxony-Anhalt
18th-century jurists
Academic staff of the Martin Luther University of Halle-Wittenberg
Members of the Prussian Academy of Sciences
German Freemasons
19th-century German jurists